Robert Pfitscher (born 25 October 1954) is an Austrian boxer. He competed in the men's middleweight event at the 1980 Summer Olympics.

References

1954 births
Living people
Austrian male boxers
Olympic boxers of Austria
Boxers at the 1980 Summer Olympics
Sportspeople from Innsbruck
Middleweight boxers
20th-century Austrian people